The subantarctic shearwater (Puffinus elegans) is a small bird species which breeds in Tristan da Cunha, islands of the southern Indian Ocean and New Zealand Subantarctic Islands.

Taxonomy
The subantarctic shearwater is sometimes considered a subspecies of the little shearwater.

References

subantarctic shearwater
Fauna of Tristan da Cunha
Birds of subantarctic islands
subantarctic shearwater